Monreko Crittenden (March 14, 1980 - June 25, 2015) was an American football offensive lineman. He played for the Alabama Vipers of Arena Football League. He was signed by the Baltimore Ravens as an undrafted free agent in 2004. He played college football at Auburn.  His untimely death was widely reported amongst Auburn fans late Thursday, June 25 and verified by news outlets the following day. Funeral service was held at St. Jude Church, Montgomery, Al, on July 3, 2015.

Crittenden also played for the Montgomery Bears, Columbus Lions and Los Angeles Avengers.

College career
Crittenden earned All-Southeastern Conference honors as a three-year starter with the Tigers.

Professional career

Baltimore Ravens
Crittenden declared himself eligible for the 2004 NFL Draft, but went undrafted. He signed as an unrestricted free agent on April 30, 2004, with the Baltimore Ravens.

References 

1980 births
Living people
Players of American football from Montgomery, Alabama
American football offensive guards
Auburn Tigers football players
Baltimore Ravens players
Montgomery Maulers players
Los Angeles Avengers players
Alabama Vipers players
Columbus Lions players